Luciano De Paola (born 30 May 1961 in Italy) is an Italian football manager and former player.

Playing career

As a player, De Paola was compared to Italian international Gennaro Gattuso, who was also a defensive midfielder.

Upon signing for Cagliari Calcio in 1988, De Paola was interviewed by Guerin Sportivo, where the author wrote that he voted for the Italian Communist Party in the early 1980s. When he joined S.S. Lazio in 1993, a journalist re-published the interview and labelled him a communist. As a result, he was blamed for the team's problems and was eventually forced to leave due to pressure from the club's supporters.

After retirement, De Paola claimed that he had never talked about politics in any interview and was never interested in it.

Coaching career
De Paola mostly worked as head coach in the minor leagues of Northern Italy. His most recent, in charge of Serie C club Pergolettese, ended on 13 April 2021 after he was sacked due to poor results. On 25 November 2021, he was hired as new head coach of Lecco. He rescinded his contract with Lecco on 11 May 2022, a few days after the end of the season.

He subsequently worked at Serie D club Città di Varese until February 2023.

References

External links
 

Italian football managers
Italian footballers
Living people
1961 births
Association football midfielders
Frosinone Calcio players
A.S.D. Francavilla players
Cagliari Calcio players
Brescia Calcio players
S.S. Lazio players
Atalanta B.C. players
Cosenza Calcio players
U.S. Pergolettese 1932 players
Piacenza Calcio 1919 managers
S.S. Arezzo managers
Calcio Lecco 1912 managers
Serie C managers